The Adventurers is a 1926 German silent adventure film directed by Rudolf Walther-Fein and starring Harry Liedtke, Erna Morena and Margarete Schlegel. The art direction was by Jacek Rotmil. The film was based on a novel by Rudolf Herzog. It premiered in Berlin on February 11, 1926.

Cast
 Harry Liedtke as Dr. Josef Otten - ein berühmter Sänger
 Erna Morena as Maria, seine Frau
 Margarete Schlegel as Carmen - deren Tochter
 Paul Biensfeldt as Klaus Güllich - Ottens Faktotum
 Eduard von Winterstein as Karl Lüttgen - Hüttenwerksbesitzer
 Mady Christians as Armely - seine Frau
 Hans Brausewetter as Moritz Lachner - Akademiker
 Franz Schönfeld as Franz Terbroich - Fabriksbesitzer
 Ernst Hofmann as Laurenz - sein Sohn
 Max Menden as Der Impresario
 Maria Lingen as Marchesa della Margarita
 Robert Leffler as Der Konzertdirektor

References

Bibliography

External links

1926 films
1926 adventure films
Films of the Weimar Republic
German silent feature films
German adventure films
Films directed by Rudolf Walther-Fein
Films based on German novels
Films set in Germany
German black-and-white films
Silent adventure films
1920s German films